Habronyx victorianus is a species of parasitic wasp. It was described by Morley in 1913. The species is named after the state of Victoria in Australia where it was first identified.

References

Ichneumonidae
Parasitic wasps